Evergestis lichenalis is a moth in the family Crambidae. It was described by George Hampson in 1900. It is found in China (Inner Mongolia, Shanxi), Central Asia and Russia.

References

Evergestis
Moths described in 1900
Moths of Asia